The Latin America Amateur Championship (LAAC) is an annual amateur golf tournament, organized in conjunction with the Augusta National Golf Club, organizer of the Masters Tournament; The R&A, organizers of The Open Championship; and the United States Golf Association (USGA). It is played at various locations throughout Latin America and was first played in 2015.

The championship is played in January and consists of 72 holes of stroke-play, with a cut for the leading 50 players and ties after 36 holes. The winner receives an invitation to the Masters Tournament, The Open Championship (from 2020),  The Amateur Championship, the U.S. Amateur and any other USGA event for which they are otherwise qualified apart from the U.S. Open. The winner and runner-up gain entry to final stage qualifying for the U.S. Open.

The field is restricted to players from the Latin American region (IOC-recognized countries and territories who are current members of the International Golf Federation) who have a handicap of 5.4 or less. The 29 countries are: Argentina, The Bahamas, Barbados, Bermuda, Bolivia, Brazil, Cayman Islands, Chile, Colombia, Costa Rica, Dominican Republic, Ecuador, El Salvador, Guatemala, Haiti, Honduras, Jamaica, Mexico, Nicaragua, Panama, Paraguay, Peru, Puerto Rico, Saint Lucia, Trinidad and Tobago, Turks and Caicos Islands, Uruguay, U.S. Virgin Islands, and Venezuela. Each country is allocated two spots in the field based on the World Amateur Golf Rankings (WAGR). The remainder of the field is filled from the WAGR with a limit of six entries per country (10 for the host country).

Winners

References

External links

Amateur golf tournaments
Golf tournaments in Argentina
Golf tournaments in the Dominican Republic
Golf tournaments in Panama
Golf tournaments in Chile
Golf tournaments in Mexico